Jorge Antonio Pi (born 16 October 1984 in Villa Aberastain) is an Argentine cyclist, who last rode for UCI Continental team .

Major results

2004
 1st  Time trial, National Under-23 Road Championships
2005
 3rd Time trial, National Under-23 Road Championships
2006
 1st Overall Giro del Sol San Juan
2010
 1st  Road race, National Road Championships

References

External links

1984 births
Living people
Argentine male cyclists
Sportspeople from San Juan Province, Argentina